In gridiron football, a dual-threat quarterback, also known as a running quarterback, is a quarterback (QB) who possesses the skills and physique to run with the ball if necessary. With the rise of several blitz heavy defensive schemes and increasingly faster defensive players, the importance of a mobile quarterback has been redefined. While arm power, accuracy, and pocket presence – the ability to successfully operate from within the "pocket" formed by his blockers – are still the most important quarterback virtues, the ability to elude or run past defenders creates an additional threat that allows greater flexibility in the team's passing and running game. Overall, the dual-threat quarterback has been referred to as "the most complex position in sports" by Bleacher Report.

Dual-threat quarterbacks have historically been more prolific at the college level. Typically, a quarterback with exceptional quickness is used in an option offense, which allows the quarterback to either hand the ball off, run it himself, or pitch it to the running back following him at a distance of three yards outside and one yard behind. This type of offense forces defenders to commit to either the running back up the middle, the quarterback around the end, or the running back trailing the quarterback. It is then that the quarterback has the "option" to identify which match up is most favorable to the offense as the play unfolds and exploit that defensive weakness. In the college game, many schools employ several plays that are designed for the quarterback to run with the ball.

For much of the NFL's modern existence, this was less common in professional football, except for a quarterback sneak; however, there was still some of an emphasis on being mobile enough to escape a heavy pass rush. Historically, dual-threat quarterbacks in the National Football League (NFL) were uncommon through the AFL–NFL merger, although Tobin Rote and Fran Tarkenton proved to be successful scrambling quarterbacks. Players like Steve Young, Randall Cunningham, and John Elway had success running in the 1980s and 1990s. However, Michael Vick is often credited as having ushered dual-threat quarterbacking into the sport's mainstream in the 2000s. In the 2010s, quarterbacks with dual-threat capabilities became increasingly more common. Those who found success in the 2010s and the 2020s, such as Cam Newton and Lamar Jackson, have cited Vick's influence on their playing styles.

History in the NFL

Pre-modern era and early modern era (1920s–1940s)
The NFL's modern era is generally thought to have begun in 1933, as a result of the NFL breaking away from college rules and the introduction of its own rule book, which included many foundational game elements. Prior to the advent of the modern era, many players were two-way players, as league rules prohibited most substitutions. Largely interchangeable, players would play multiple positions on offense and defense even into the early 1940s. Due to this, passers were just as, if not more likely to run with the football than to pass. However, they would become more specialized in position over time, "as coaches adopted new strategies to take advantage of players with unique physical attributes and skills — all in the name of trying to gain an edge on their opponents." As a result, quarterbacks became distinct passers of the football, whereas halfbacks would absorb much of the run play responsibilities on a team.

Early history of dual-threats (1950s–70s)

In the 1950s, Tobin Rote was a rare example of a dual-threat quarterback; he led the Green Bay Packers in rushing in three seasons, and retired with 3,128 yards.

The next decade, however, saw Fran Tarkenton influence the game in both passing and running aspects. Tarkenton writes, "When I began my NFL career in 1961, I was a freak. The reason was simple: I played quarterback and I ran. There were no designed runs in our playbook, but I would scramble out of the pocket when a play broke down." Tarkenton adds by describing the reaction to his scrambling at the time, "It was not a skill set that was embraced. Plenty of people mocked it, and the rest wrote it off." At the time of his retirement, Tarkenton was the all-time leader in rushing yards by a quarterback, with 3,674.

Roger Staubach, quarterback of the Dallas Cowboys from 1969–1979, was another early dual-threat quarterback; in 2012, Bleacher Report placed him sixth on their list of the greatest dual-threats of all-time. The website noted Staubach "would run, juke, dive or underhand toss the ball in almost any situation."

Greg Landry was also cited as a dual-threat during the 1970s. Following his 1971 season with the Detroit Lions—in which he became the first quarterback to pass for over 2,000 yards and rush for over 500 yards in the same season—Sports Illustrated asserted that Landry's ability to both pass and run with the football gave the Lions "the pro offense of the future." Landry replicated the feat in 1972. The Lions' head coach Joe Schmidt "installed option plays—the heart of the old split-T formation, the granddaddy of the Wishbone—to take advantage of Landry's running ability." This allowed Landry to run on designed plays, in contrast to the scrambling nature displayed by Tarkenton and Staubach.

Also in 1972, Chicago Bears quarterback Bobby Douglass set the single-season rushing yards record for a quarterback, as he logged 968 yards. Douglass, however, was not considered a good passer.  His receivers complained that his arm was "too strong," and he often overthrew the ball. The Bears attempted to create wild schemes, before discovering his rushing ability, leading to his record-breaking 1972 season.

Another rare dual-threat quarterback that emerged in the 1970s was Steve Grogan. Drafted by the New England Patriots in 1975, Grogan scored 12 rushing touchdowns in the 1976 season, a record for quarterbacks which stood for 35 years. During the 1978 season, Grogan ran for 539 yards, on a team which set the NFL record for total rushing yards (3,165), which was held until the 2019 Baltimore Ravens rushing offense surpassed it. Limited by injuries during the middle part of his career, Grogan would transition to a more traditional pocket-passer by the mid-1980s.

Increased frequency (1980s−1990s)

During the 1980s and 90s, dual-threat quarterbacks were more frequently seen than in previous decades. Randall Cunningham and Steve Young were prominent rushing quarterbacks during this era. Cunningham was able to exceed Young in statistical regards. On October 18, 1992, Cunningham surpassed Tarkenton's record for career rushing yards by a quarterback. Following the 2001 NFL season, Cunningham retired with a then-record 4,928 rushing yards. Despite Cunningham having more rushing yards, Young held the record for most career rushing touchdowns by a quarterback (43) until being surpassed by Cam Newton in 2016.

There is debate as to whether Young or Cunningham was the better rushing quarterback. CraveOnline writes that, although, "there may be two others [Vick and Cunningham] that hold an edge to Steve Young in amount of yards rushed, career wise, by a QB but make no mistake about it, if you are a QB that can run, then Young is who you want to emulate," adding that, Young, "had the rare gift of explosive speed combined with deadly accuracy." As for Cunningham, Jeff Darlington, an NFL Media reporter, writes, "True, Steve Young had legs that merited the respect of defenders. But Cunningham ... Cunningham was different. And today's quarterbacks know it." Darlington adds to his point by referring to an anecdote from Robert Griffin III, a 2010s rushing quarterback, in which Griffin III would watch Cunningham's highlights with his father. Griffin III elaborates, "We'd watch how well he moved in the pocket to avoid defenders and make plays -- not just with his legs, but with his arm. He was one of the first true game-changers the league saw."

In addition to Cunnhingham and Young, John Elway, Steve McNair, and Kordell Stewart, were also considered dynamic running quarterbacks of the 1980s and 1990s. Elway appeared in 5 Super Bowls and holds the record of most rushing TDs by any quarterback in the Super Bowl.

The Michael Vick effect (2000s)

As Young, Cunningham, and John Elway all retired between 1998 and 2001, a new generation of mobile quarterbacks was ushered in. Donovan McNabb was drafted by the Eagles in 1999, beginning a successful quarterbacking career, in which his running ability was frequently noted. In 2000, McNabb became the first quarterback to lead his team in both passing and rushing yards. On his mobility, McNabb once joked, "I think you run a lot better when you don't want to be hit." After sustaining an injury in the 2003 season, there was speculation as to whether McNabb would be able to retain his mobility, as Ray Buchanan stated, "We'd probably rather see McNabb, because he's not as mobile right now," to which McNabb responded, "According to everyone else I'm not mobile. I'll just let people continue to think that, and when the time comes, I'll make sure I showcase that a little bit."

McNabb was also connected to Michael Vick, one of the most prolific running quarterbacks in the history of the NFL. While attending Syracuse University, McNabb attempted to assist in the recruitment of Michael Vick, and in addition to that, McNabb also mentored Vick about the speed of the professional level. Vick also served as McNabb's backup in Philadelphia in 2009, later succeeding McNabb as the starter for the franchise. Michael Vick was drafted first overall by Atlanta Falcons in 2001. Vick would go on to be a successful runner for the Falcons from 2001 to 2006. 14 games into his 2006 season, Vick broke Douglass' single-season rushing yards record by a quarterback. A week later, Vick surpassed the 1,000 rushing yards milestone, becoming the first quarterback to reach the mark in a single season. He finished the season with a record 1,039 yards. Vick's mobility influenced future mobile quarterbacks; Jenny Vrentas of Sports Illustrated writes, "Young players go out of their way to tell Vick that they were always him when they played Madden growing up, and wore his Nike cleats."

After his return to the NFL, and a season as McNabb's backup, Vick earned his second starting opportunity. His 2010 rushing statistics (league-leading 676 yards among quarterbacks and 9 touchdowns) were the foundation for the acceptance of mobile quarterbacks in the early 2010s. On his overall impact and legacy in regards to dual-threat quarterbacks, Vick stated, "I was the guy who started it all," adding, "I revolutionized the game. I changed the way it was played in the NFL."

Newfound implementation of dual-threats (early 2010s)

During the 2011 season, on October 9, Vick surpassed Cunningham's career rushing yardage record for quarterbacks. That season also saw Cam Newton drafted first overall by the Carolina Panthers. Newton went on to lead quarterbacks in rushing yards, with 706, and broke Steve Grogan's 1976 single-season record for rushing touchdowns by a quarterback (12), with 14.

In addition to Newton, notable dual-threat quarterbacks in the early 2010s included Aaron Rodgers, Robert Griffin III, Tim Tebow, Colin Kaepernick, Russell Wilson, and Andrew Luck. Rodgers, often cited as one of the most talented players to play quarterback, is noted for often using his mobility to avoid pressure and extend plays.

In the 2014 season, Kaepernick, Griffin III, and Newton were all cited as declining or regressing players. Kaepernick was labeled, "symbolic of running QB struggles," by NFL.com writer Chris Wesseling. This status came after Kaepernick and the 49ers were defeated by Derek Carr and the Oakland Raiders. Carr is not considered a dual-threat quarterback, though his "mindset, athleticism, pocket presence, quick release and strong arm" have all been praised by executives, coaches and analysts. Steve Young, who ranks third all-time in rushing yards for a quarterback, was cited as believing scrambling away from pressure limits and stunts the development of a quarterback's pocket presence. During the season, Bill Polian, a former Indianapolis Colts president, stated, "What we're seeing this year is the incredible erosion of the running quarterback." Obstacles such as high expectations and an increased risk of injury hindered the perception that mobile quarterbacks would dominate the position.

While Kaepernick, Newton, and Griffin III struggled during the season, the mobility of other quarterbacks was praised. Success in the passing game, while using mobility to extend plays, was regarded more highly than pure running athleticism in 2014. Aaron Rodgers' mobility, for example, was considered by one NFL.com writer to be critical to the Packers' offense. New England Patriots head coach Bill Belichick praised Rodgers' mobility, stating, "he has a great ability to extend plays, either sliding in the pocket or at times scrambling outside the pocket." Luck's mobility was also acclaimed by NFL head coach Chip Kelly. Despite early-season reports of a decline in the performance of dual-threat quarterbacks, Russell Wilson rushed for a career-high 849 yards, 6 touchdowns and a league high 7.2 yards per attempt in 2014, leading the Seattle Seahawks to a second consecutive Super Bowl appearance.

Cementing viability and the introduction of the run-pass option (late 2010s–2020s)
Midway through the 2010s, the long-term viability of dual-threat quarterbacks in the NFL was being debated by sports publications. "Waning results and injuries" to quarterbacks such as Robert Griffin III and Johnny Manziel were cited as reasons why "the league [seemed] less keen on dual-threat quarterbacks." Griffin and Kaepernick had their futures as starting NFL quarterbacks called into question by sports writers in 2015. Local Bay Area media described Kaepernick's run as the 49ers' starter as "flashy" and cited a league source predicting his release following the 2015 season. College quarterbacks with dual-threat abilities were being cited as potentially not having their skill sets translate into the NFL.

However, new dual-threat quarterbacks emerged as starters during 2015, such as Marcus Mariota and Tyrod Taylor. Cam Newton also had a resurgent season, scoring 10 rushing touchdowns en route to an MVP selection and a Super Bowl berth. However, as Newton was also successful in his passing game, one Wall Street Journal reporter wrote that "defenses say it is Newton's ability to do anything on any given play that really keeps them up at night", adding "[Newton] is a pass-first quarterback capable of picking up a first down with his legs at any moment."

Dual-threat quarterbacks have continued to rise in significance in the NFL during the late 2010s; Deshaun Watson and Lamar Jackson, among others, emerged as dynamic starting options during their rookie seasons (2017 and 2018, respectively). In 2019, Jackson surpassed Vick's single-season rushing yards record among quarterbacks, while also recording a league-leading 36 passing touchdowns en route to an MVP award.

In addition to Jackson and Watson, Josh Allen, Daniel Jones, Patrick Mahomes, Kyler Murray, and Dak Prescott emerged as mobile threats from the late 2010s NFL draft classes. By 2022, the budding rivalry between Allen and Mahomes, who had met in the playoffs in consecutive years, began to see comparisons to the Tom Brady–Peyton Manning rivalry, though Gary Gramling of Sports Illustrated noted that detractors would claim that the mobile style of play used by Allen and Mahomes was "less sustainable" than that of Brady and Manning, two classic pocket quarterbacks.

Around the time of these quarterbacks entering the league, NFL offenses began to increasingly adopt run-pass option (RPO) plays during games. The Philadelphia Eagles are often credited with popularizing RPOs in the NFL, due to their success running them late in 2017, en route to a Super Bowl LII victory.

Writing for The Ringer in 2018, Robert Mays elaborated on RPOs:
"RPOs, at their core, are highly advanced extensions of old-school option principles. On zone reads and triple-option plays, QBs read first-level defenders such as defensive tackles and defensive ends and make decisions based on how those players react. From there, offenses key in on second-level defenders like linebackers and slot cornerbacks in an attempt to manipulate areas in the middle of the field. That's the current extent of NFL RPOs."

In the 2020s, Jalen Hurts and Justin Fields emerged as oft-cited dual-threat talents.

Criticism of term's racial connotation

Black quarterbacks often get tagged as dual-threats, rather than "pro-style" quarterbacks while still high school prospects. In 2012, Bleacher Report wrote, "By the time kids establish themselves as prospects to watch, they're already christened "pro style" or "dual threat." Either they're the kind of quarterback that can succeed in the NFL, or they're black." The term's usage as a stereotyping of black quarterbacks in draft scouting reports has also been documented.

Some quarterbacks have expressed discontent with being tagged as a "dual-threat quarterback". The term has been noted to be used disproportionately more often for black quarterbacks, "with racial undertones to how they are perceived in the NFL." Michael Vick opined that "A lot of us [black quarterbacks] aren't viewed as passers -- we're viewed as athletes. I think it's unfair and unfortunate." In 2018, The Undefeated writer Jeff Rivers commented:

"Even in recent years, the term 'dual-threat' (running and passing) has been used as a barrier in the final goal-line stand between black athletes and equal access to the NFL quarterback position, its glory and all its risks and rewards. To some, running was evidence that quarterbacks, especially black quarterbacks, weren't smart enough to decide when to pass."

In an interview with Bleacher Report, while still a college quarterback at Clemson, Deshaun Watson called the term a "code word" and expressed that he was stereotyped as a run-first quarterback due to his race. In 2018, now playing for the Houston Texans, Watson was the target of a racially-charged criticism from a Texas school district superintendent. The superintendent criticized a late-game mistake by Watson, commenting, "When you need precision decision making you can't count on a black quarterback."

See also
List of dual-threat quarterback records

Notes

References

African-American sports history
African Americans and sport
American football terminology
Canadian football terminology
History of American football
History of the National Football League
Sports culture